Elu Suttina Kote is an Indian Kannada-language film released in 1987. It is directed by B. C. Gowrishankar and produced by Sa Ra Govindhu.

It stars Rebel Star Ambareesh, Gouthami, Ramesh Aravind, Sundarakrishna Urs, Nagesh Kashyap, Shankar Rao, with Devaraj, Sadashiva Brahmavara, Honnavalli Krishna, Mandeep Rai, Kavya and Sunil Raoh in cameo roles. It enjoys cult classic status in Kannada cinema industry.

Soundtrack
The music for the film was composed by carnatic musician L. Vaidyanathan.

References
http://beta.musicmazaa.com/kannada/audiosongs/movie/Elu+Suttina+Kote.html

1987 films
1980s Kannada-language films